is a video game series developed by Sunsoft that was released primarily in Japan, with a few releases in Europe and one release in North America. It was one of the company's main franchises during the 1990s. Hebe, the main character of the series, became Sunsoft's main mascot during this period, appearing on the company's logo in several games and commercials. The series features a comical, yet surreal setting and characters. The title of the series comes from a Japanese colloquialism for drunkenness. The series covers several different genres from platforming to puzzle, though they are all set in the same fictional universe. Although there are 9 games in the series, only 3 of them were released outside of Japan: Ufouria: The Saga for the NES, Hebereke's Popoon for the SNES, and Hebereke's Popoitto for the SNES, PlayStation, and Sega Saturn. All three of these games were only released in Japan and Europe, with no North American release, although Ufouria: The Saga would be released on the Wii Virtual Console in North America almost 18 years later, and on the Wii U Virtual Console in North America almost 22 years later.

The first Hebereke game for the Nintendo Entertainment System was released in the PAL region under the title of Ufouria: The Saga, which changed the names of the main characters, while two of them had their looks changed. A North American release was planned, but canceled alongside Mr. Gimmick due to its quirky character design; however, the PAL region version was later added to the Wii Virtual Console in North America. A later set of games for the Super Nintendo Entertainment System were also released under the Hebereke title, which retained the original names and looks from the Japanese version.

List of games
Developer Sunsoft used the characters and world featured in Hebereke in a series of games for Family Computer, Super Famicom, Sega Saturn, PlayStation, coin-operated arcades and mobile phones.

Cameos 
 The Hebereke characters made a cameo appearance in Sunsoft's Mega Drive port of Lemmings, appearing in level 18 of the "Sunsoft" setting.
 O-Chan appears on one of the courts in Yeh Yeh Tennis (Wai Wai Tennis 2 in Japan) for the PlayStation.
 Hebereke was listed as a graphics designer in the credits of Journey to Silius in 1990.
 The characters from Hebereke  also made an appearance in Barcode World, along with other Sunsoft characters, but only as cards that come with the game.
 Hebe appears as a random encounter in Benkei Gaiden: Suna no Shō, having the highest granting experience in the entire game.
 In Honō no Tōkyūji: Dodge Danpei, there is an extra secret password, HEBE, that gives the player a menu to view all game cutscenes, including the ending.
 In the Shanghai series, the Hebereke characters made a cameo appearance in its mobile spin-off entry, Shanghai Musume: Mahjong Girls.
 The characters from Hebereke appeared as guest characters as downloadable content in the remake of Penguin Wars for the Nintendo Switch on 2017 in Japan.

Merchandise

Comic strip
Ryōji Uchimichi, the series' character designer, drew a yonkoma manga series based on the games that were serialized by Tokuma Shoten in the Japanese magazine Family Computer Magazine (also known as "Famimaga" for short) since September 6, 1991. On September 30, 1995, the first two years' worth of strips were reprinted in a collection titled , but the remaining strips were never republished. It was eventually christened  on April 21, 1997, before getting cancelled on March 20, 1998, following the discontinuation of Famimaga.

A yonkoma manga series based on the Hebereke games, titled , was released on August 12, 2013, being published by Comic Market in Japan.

Original soundtrack
On June 25, 1994, a soundtrack titled  was released, published by DATAM Polystar. It featured original versions of the music from the first three Hebereke games: Hebereke, Hebereke's Popoon and Sugoi Hebereke. It also includes those from another Sunsoft game, Gimmick! (known in Europe as Mr. Gimmick). The soundtrack was composed by Naoki Kodaka, Phaseout & Mutec, and Masashi Kageyama, and was arranged by Hitoshi Sakimoto.

Characters

The series sports characters and graphics that are typically Japanese cuteness in design, done in the style of Bomberman, The New Zealand Story, and particularly Hello Kitty.

The series primarily involves a cast of four main characters: Hebe, O-Chan, Sukezaemon, and Jennifer. It also involves four notable minor characters: Bobodori, Pen-Chan, Utsujin, and Unyohn.

Major characters
Hebe (sometimes referred to as "Hebereke", Bop-Louie in Ufouria)

Voiced by: Megumi Hayashibara

, known in Ufouria as Bop-Louie, is a small white albino penguin (a living snowman in Ufouria). He is seen wearing a blue knit cap with a white pom-pom in it. He is the fastest in terms of speed, but he doesn't jump as high, can't walk on ice, and also cannot swim. He could extend his neck to attack enemies using the Kubidokkan attack. He can also climb using a suction cup.

O-Chan (Freeon-Leon in Ufouria)

Voiced by: Mika Kanai

, known in Ufouria as Freeon-Leon, is a little girl dressed with a cat suit (a male lizard in Ufouria). Unlike Hebe, she is able to swim in water and safely walk on ice without slipping. She has a high-flying personality and has a high laugh.

Sukezaemon (Shades in Ufouria)

Voiced by: Norio Wakamoto

, known in Ufouria as Shades, is a white ghost with black sunglasses and a red winged cap. With his light body, he can drift in the air for a long time. He also has a serious personality and is moslty polite.

Jennifer (Gil in Ufouria)

Voiced by: Shigeru Chiba

, known in Ufouria as Gil, is a green anglerfish with a yellow antenna. He's an underwater expert, being able to walk underwater. He speaks badly, but is kind-tempered.

Minor characters
Bobodori

Voiced by: Shigeru Chiba

 is a male purple bird.

Pen-Chan

Voiced by: Megumi Hayashibara

 is a little girl dressed with a penguin suit. She doesn't have a first person pronoun in Japanese, instead using her name.

Utsujin

Voiced by: Norio Wakamoto

 is a male orange cat wearing an alien suit, being part of the Muu Cat Brothers clan. He doesn't have a first person pronoun in Japanese, instead using , an abbreviation of his name.

Unyohn

Voice actor: Norio Wakamoto

 is an alien wearing a helmet. His color palette depends on the game.

Notes

References 

Video game franchises
Sunsoft games
Hebereke
Video game franchises introduced in 1991
Video games developed in Japan
Success (company) games

it:Hebereke